The 1921–22 Princeton Tigers men's basketball team represented Princeton University in intercollegiate college basketball during the 1921–22 NCAA men's basketball season. The head coach was J. Hill Zahn and the team captain was Albert Wittmer. The team played its home games in the University Gymnasium on the university campus in Princeton, New Jersey.  The team was the winner of the Eastern Intercollegiate Basketball League (EIBL).

The team posted a 20–5 overall record and a 9–2 conference record. The team earned the school's first conference championship.

The team was led by All-American Arthur Loeb. who repeated as an All-American the following season. Loeb was the school's second two-time All-American (Cyril Haas, 1915–16 & 1916–17).  Bill Bradley became the only other Princeton Tiger to equal (and later surpass) this accomplishment.

References

Princeton Tigers men's basketball seasons
Princeton Tigers
Princeton Tigers men's basketball
Princeton Tigers men's basketball